A list of American films released in 1998.

Shakespeare in Love won the Academy Award for Best Picture.

Highest-grossing films

A-Z

See also
 1998 in American television
 1998 in the United States

External links

 
 List of 1998 box office number-one films in the United States

1998
Films
Lists of 1998 films by country or language